Rendezvous with Destiny may refer to:

 Rendezvous with Destiny (TV series), a 2007 Algerian television series
 A 1936 presidential nomination acceptance speech by Franklin D. Roosevelt — see 1936 Democratic National Convention
 A 1952 book titled Rendezvous With Destiny: A History of Modern American Reform — see Eric F. Goldman 
 A 1964 television program that included a speech by Ronald Reagan in support of Barry Goldwater — see A Time for Choosing
 U.S. Army 101st Airborne Division Motto